The San Francisco Church (Spanish:Iglesia de San Francisco) is a defunct church along San Francisco and Solana Streets in the walled city of Intramuros, Manila, Philippines. The church, which used to be the center of the Franciscan missions in the Philippines, was destroyed during the Second World War. The site has been occupied by Mapúa University since the war.

History

When the Franciscans arrived in the Philippines in 1578, they built a church made of nipa, bamboo and wood, which was inaugurated on August 2 and was dedicated to the Our Lady of Angels. On November 5, 1739, the cornerstone of a new stone church was laid. It was destroyed in the bombings of Manila during the Second World War. The statue of Saint Anthony of Padua in the courtyard of Santuario de San Antonio in Forbes Park, Makati, was the lone survivor of the ravages of the war. Since World War II, the site has been occupied by the Mapúa Institute of Technology.

See also
 San Ignacio Church of Intramuros

Notes

Bibliography

 

Roman Catholic churches in Manila
Buildings and structures in Intramuros
Former buildings and structures in Manila
Destroyed churches
Francisco Manila